Crossroads is a play by Bahram Beyzai, written in 2009 and first staged in 2018 at Stanford University.

Text
Written in 2009, Crossroads is the last play Beyzai wrote before he left Iran. The text was published as a book in the winter of 2020.

First production
Crossroads was premiered at Roble Studio Theater, Stanford in 23 March, 2018. It was directed by the author and the two major roles were played by Mojdeh Shamsaie and Ali Zandiyye.

References
 احیا, حمید (2018). ««رئالیزمِ معمول را بگذارید کنار»: یادداشت‌هایی از تمرینِ «چهارراه»». دفترهای تآتر. 15.
 نورایی, جهانبخش (2021). «اگر دنیا کمی بهتر بود!». فیلم امروز. 5.

External links
 

2009 plays
Cultural depictions of educators
Plays about writers
Plays by Bahram Beyzai
Plays set in Iran
Plays set in the 21st century
Stage productions by Bahram Beyzai